Athena is a 1954 American romantic musical comedy film directed by Richard Thorpe and starring Jane Powell, Edmund Purdom, Debbie Reynolds, Vic Damone, Louis Calhern, Steve Reeves, and Evelyn Varden. It was released by Metro-Goldwyn-Mayer.

The film tells the story of an old-fashioned conservative lawyer who falls in love with a daughter from a family of fitness fanatics.

Plot
Conservative lawyer Adam Calhorn Shaw (Edmund Purdom) hopes to be elected to office, like his father, and his father's father. He is engaged to a sophisticated society lady, Beth Hallson (Linda Christian).

Arriving at a nursery to complain about the peach trees he had purchased, Adam meets the energetic and eccentric Athena Mulvain (Jane Powell), the oldest of seven sisters in a family of anti-smoking, vegetarian, teetotallers who follow astrology and numerology.

Athena offers to give him advice on how to mulch the peach trees, however, Adam is uneasy, and leaves. Later, at a party, Athena arrives, mulches Adam's peach trees, kisses him, and announces her intention to marry him. She also decides, after a numerological calculation, that Adam's friend Johnny Nyle (Vic Damone) would be perfect for her sister, Minerva (Debbie Reynolds).

Athena returns to Adam's house the next morning, to the shock of Adam's fiancée. Adam promises to tell Athena that he has no romantic interest in her, but finds she has left. He asks his legal secretary Miss Seely to search for her but to no avail. Eventually Johnny returns and tells Adam that Athena's family owns a health food store, and that he can find her there.

That night when Adam goes to the house, he meets the meditating Grandma Salome, Minerva and Athena's 5 other beautiful, singing and dancing sisters: Niobe, Aphrodite, Calliope, Medea and Ceres. He also meets the bodybuilders that the girls' grandfather (Louis Calhern) has been training for the Mr. Universe competition, Ed Perkins and Bill Nichols.

Despite the bizarre ways of the family, and although Adam initially tries to resist Athena, he eventually succumbs to her charms, and breaks up with Beth. Just when all is looking rosy, Grandma foresees difficult times ahead. Athena's sisters advise Athena to break up with Adam, however Athena chooses to push ahead with the relationship, knowing that "love can change the stars".

The sisters visit Adam's house while he is out and perform a makeover, removing rugs and screens and installing large urns and fresh flowers. Adam's influential family friend, Mr. Grenville, Adam's law firm partner, Mr. Griswalde, and Adam's campaign manager for election to the United States Congress, Mr. Tremaine, phone Adam's house and reach Athena on the phone. Curious, they visit Adam's house only to find Grandma there in place of the girls.

Adam invites Athena to a formal reception at Mr. Grenville's home. Athena at first charms the party with her pleasant nature and an off-the-cuff rendition of an aria from a Donizetti opera. However she loses her temper when Beth presents Athena with a buffet dinner where all of the vegetables are stuffed with meat.

More difficulties arise when Adam humiliates Ed Perkins and Grandpa on television at the "Mr. Universe" final. Grandpa had hoped that Ed would marry Athena to produce perfect children.  Adam verbally attacks Grandpa over the hypocrisy of many of his beliefs.  Ed threatens Adam by putting him in a hold that Adam gets out of by throwing Ed in a jiu jitsu throw with both events appearing on nationwide television.  Adam is told by his minders that his political career is over because he embarrassed the belief system of Athena's people, alienating voters with those sympathies, whilst those opposed to their beliefs would associate Adam with holding their beliefs by merely being with them.

Despite requisite further conflict, harmony is restored and all of the main players gather around for a Mulvain-style feast.

Cast

 Jane Powell as Athena Mulvain
 Edmund Purdom as Adam Calhorn Shaw
 Debbie Reynolds as Minerva Mulvain
 Vic Damone as Johnny Nyle
 Louis Calhern as Ulysses Mulvain
 Linda Christian as Beth Hallson
 Evelyn Varden as Salome Mulvain
 Ray Collins as Mr Tremaine
 Carl Benton Reid as Mr Griswalde
 Howard Wendell as Mr Grenville
 Virginia Gibson as Niobe
 Henry Nakamura as Roy
 Nancy Kilgas as Aphrodite
 Dolores Starr as Calliope
 Jane Fischer as Medea
 Cecile Rogers as Ceres
 Kathleen Freeman as Miss Seely
 Steve Reeves as Ed Perkins
 Richard Sabre as Bill Nichols

Songs
The film features several songs by Hugh Martin and Ralph Blane including

 "Athena" (Chorus)
 "The Girl Next Door" (Vic Damone), a slight variation on the 1944 hit "The Boy Next Door" from Meet Me in St Louis
 "Vocalize" (Jane Powell) which is reprised later in a choral arrangement as "Harmonize" (Jane Powell, Louis Calhern, Chorus)
 "Imagine" (Debbie Reynolds, Vic Damone)
 "Love can change the Stars" (Jane Powell, Sisters, Vic Damone)
 "Never felt better" (Debbie Reynolds, Jane Powell, Sisters)
 "Venezia" (Vic Damone)
 Donizetti's "Chacun le sait" from La fille du régiment (The Daughter of the Regiment) (Jane Powell)

Doublepack 7" track list Mercury EP-2-3284
 A1 Jane Powell: Vocalize
 A2 Vic Damone: The Girl Next Door

 B1 Debbie Reynolds: I Never Felt Better
 B2 Jane Powell: Love Can Change The Stars

 C1 Vic Damone: Love Can Change The Stars
 C2 Vic Damone And Debbie Reynolds: Imagine

 D1 Vic Damone: Venezia
 D2 Jane Powell: Chacun Le Sait

Production
The film was an original story. It was originally meant to star Elizabeth Taylor rather than Jane Powell. Esther Williams then became attached. In 1953 Williams left for maternity leave. Before her departure, she had assumed she would appear in Athena when she returned, as she claimed that she had helped create the premise with writers Leo Pogostin and Charles Walters.

MGM initially announced that Williams' appearance in Athena would be postponed to enable her to make another musical Bermuda for Joe Pasternak. However, the studio decided to cast Williams in Jupiter's Darling and replaced her with Jane Powell, who was taken off Love Me or Leave Me. They changed the main character from a swimmer to a singer, to accommodate Powell. Janet Leigh and Vera-Ellen were also cast in the film, but dropped out.

The male lead was given to Edmund Purdom who had become a leading man in The Student Prince (1954). MGM head of production Dore Schary was keen to build up Purdom as a star. Filming was pushed back so Purdom could replace Marlon Brando in The Egyptian.

Chiquita and Johnson from the Moulin Rouge were meant to appear in the film.

Filming
Director Dick Thorpe was less than enthusiastic about the picture. After a scene was finished, he would toss the pages of the script over his shoulder and walk away. In her autobiography, Jane Powell said that it really discouraged the cast. Powell also said that the film would have been better received had it been made twenty years later.

Edmund Purdom and Linda Christian had an affair during filming and later married.

Reception

Box office
According to MGM records the film made $1,222,000 in the US and Canada and $658,000 elsewhere resulting in a loss of $511,000.

Legacy
Steve Reeves' appearance in the film led to his casting in Hercules (1958). The 13-year-old daughter of that film's director, Pietro Francisci, saw Reeves in Athena and recommended him to her father. This was one of two films where Reeve's actual voice was heard; Jail Bait (1954) is the other. His European films were all dubbed by voice actors.

References

External links
 
 
 
 

1954 films
1954 musical comedy films
1954 romantic comedy films
Athena
1950s English-language films
Films directed by Richard Thorpe
Films produced by Joe Pasternak
Films with screenplays by William Ludwig
Films about trees
American musical comedy films
American romantic comedy films
American romantic musical films
1950s romantic musical films
1950s American films